The following are international rankings of Kosovo:

Demographics

Population 2011, ranked 150 out of 244 countries.
Population density 2011, ranked 75 out of 243 countries.
World Bank: List of states by fertility rate 2010, ranked 104 out of 197 countries.
OECD: List of states by birth rate 2011, ranked 110 out of 236 countries.

Economy

International Monetary Fund: GDP (nominal) per capita 2011, ranked 110 out of 185 countries.
 International Monetary Fund: GDP (nominal) 2012, ranked 141 out of 183 countries.
World Bank: GDP (nominal) per capita 2011, ranked 114 out of 190 countries.
 World Bank: GDP (nominal) 2011, ranked 140 out of 190 countries.
 World Bank: Ease of Doing Business Index 2013 report, ranked 98 out of 185 countries.
 United Nations: Human Development Index 2012, ranked 87 out of 187 countries.
Forbes: The World's Happiest Countries 2010, ranked 54 out of 155 countries.

Energy

 The Second largest coal reserves in Europe.
 The Fifth largest reserve of lignite on the planet.

Politics

Reporters Without Borders: Press Freedom Index 2018, ranked 78th out of 180 countries.
Freedom House: Freedom of the Press (report) 2017,  ranked 96th out of 189 countries.
 Transparency International: Corruption Perceptions Index 2016, ranked 95th out of 178 countries.

Religion

 List of Muslim majority countries: ranked 31.
 The second European country with the highest concentration of Muslims (90%, only after Turkey).

Geography

Total area ranked 168 out of 249 countries.
Coastline length: ranked 154 out of 154 countries.

Notes

References

Kosovo